Do Number Ke Ameer is a 1974 Bollywood social drama film directed by P.D. Shenoy.

Cast
Jalal Agha   
A.K. Hangal   
I. S. Johar   
Roopesh Kumar   
Sujit Kumar   
Asha Sachdev
Bharat Bhushan
Padma Khanna
Kamal Kapoor
Urmila Bhatt
Asha Chandra
Sajid
Sonika
Vijay Ganju as Bhagyavaan

Music

External links
 

1974 films
1970s Hindi-language films
1974 drama films
Indian drama films
Hindi-language drama films